Alldays Airport  is an airport serving Alldays, a town in the Limpopo province in South Africa.

Facilities

See also
 List of airports in South Africa

References

External links
 

Airports in South Africa
Buildings and structures in Limpopo
Transport in Limpopo
Capricorn District Municipality